Paralopostega filiforma is a moth of the family Opostegidae. It was first described by Otto Swezey in 1921. It is endemic to the Hawaiian island of Oahu.

The larvae feed on Melicope clusiaefolia, Melicope elliptica and Melicope sapotaefolia. They mine the leaves of their host plant. The mine is very slender and thread like, wandering without any special order throughout the leaf, finally going down into the petiole and mining in the cambium layer.

External links
Generic Revision of the Opostegidae, with a Synoptic Catalog of the World's Species (Lepidoptera: Nepticuloidea)

Opostegidae
Endemic moths of Hawaii
Biota of Oahu
Moths described in 1921